This is a list of flag bearers who have represented the Democratic Republic of the Congo at the Olympics.

Flag bearers carry the national flag of their country at the opening ceremony of the Olympic Games.

See also
 Democratic Republic of the Congo at the Olympics

References

Democratic Republic of the Congo at the Olympics
Congo
Olympic flagbearers
Olympic flagbearers